= Salix chingiana =

Scientific classification
- Kingdom: Plantae
- Clade: Tracheophytes
- Clade: Angiosperms
- Clade: Eudicots
- Clade: Rosids
- Order: Malpighiales
- Family: Salicaceae
- Genus: Salix
- Species: S. chingiana

Binomial name
- Salix chingiana K.S.Hao ex C.F.Fang & A.K.Skvortsov

Tree in the genus of willows

Salix chingiana is a small tree in the willow genus Salix with dull purple-colored, bare branches. The stipules are permanent, the leaf blades are 7 to 10 centimeters long. The natural range of the species is in China.

== Taxonomy ==
The species was described in 1998 by Kin Shen Hao.

== Description ==
Salix chingiana is a tree up to 7 meters high with dull purple-colored and bare branches. The leaves have ovate or obliquely ovate stipules and an approximately 1.3 centimeter long, glabrous and sometimes glandular petiole towards the blade. The leaf blade is lanceolate or narrowly lanceolate, 7 to 10 centimeters long and 1.7 to 2 centimeters wide, pointed or pointed, with a wedge-shaped base and a glandular serrate edge. The upper side of the leaf is green, the underside pale and bare.

The male inflorescences are catkins about 3 centimeters long and 6 millimeters in diameter. The peduncle has two or three, rarely up to five leaves. The inflorescence axis is hairy white shaggy. The bracts are narrowly ovate, about 1.7 millimeters long, shaggy hairy on top and glabrous on the underside. Male flowers have an adaxial and an abaxial nectar gland that have grown together at the base to form four lobes. The rarely only three, usually four and rarely up to six stamenshave about 3.5 millimeters long and at the base sparsely downy hairy stamens. Female catkins are about 4 centimeters long to flower and can reach 10 centimeters in length when the fruit is ripe. The peduncle is long and has two or three leaves. The inflorescence axis is finely hairy. The bracts are downy hairy on the upper side, the underside is also downy hairy or almost bald. Female flowers have a cylindrical or nearly square, adaxial gland. The ovary is ellipsoid-cylindrical or ellipsoidal, rarely ovate, bald and long stalked. The stylus is inconspicuous, the stigma three-lobed. Salix chingiana flowers after the leaves shoot in July, the fruits ripen from July to August.

== Range ==
The natural range is in the southeast of the Chinese province of Gansu and in the east of Qinghai. Salix chingiana grows near bodies of water at altitudes of 2600 to 3100 meters.

== Literature ==
- Wu Zheng-yi, Peter H. Raven (Ed.): Flora of China . Volume 4: Cycadaceae through Fagaceae . Science Press / Missouri Botanical Garden Press, Beijing / St. Louis 1999, ISBN 0-915279-70-3, pp. 171, 176 (English)
